AWUNZ may mean:

 Northern Amalgamated Workers' Union in New Zealand
 Southern Amalgamated Workers' Union in New Zealand